Tombak-e Bala (also Romanized as Tombak-e Bālā; also known as Tombak and Tonbak) is a village in Howmeh Rural District, in the Central District of Minab County, Hormozgan Province, Iran. At the 2006 census, its population was 10, in 4 families.

References 

Populated places in Minab County